The 1987–88 Baylor Bears men's basketball team represented Baylor University as a member of the Southwest Conference during the 1987–88 men's college basketball season. The team was led by head coach Gene Iba and played their home games at Heart O' Texas Coliseum in Waco, Texas. After finishing tied for second in the SWC regular season standings, the Bears lost to SMU in the championship game of the SWC tournament. Baylor received an at-large bid to the NCAA tournament – the program's first appearance in 38 years. As No. 8 seed in the Midwest region, the Bears were defeated by No. 9 seed Memphis State in opening round to finish the season with a record of 23–11 (11–5 SWC).

Senior guard Micheal Williams finished his career as the all-time leader in steals (including the top two single-season performances) and assists at Baylor. He also finished second on the career scoring list. Williams was taken by the Detroit Pistons in the second round of the 1988 NBA draft. Senior forward Darryl Middleton finished his career third all-time on the scoring list (including the single-season record for points) and fourth in rebounds. Middleton was drafted by the Atlanta Hawks in the third round of the 1988 NBA draft.

Roster

Schedule and results

|-
!colspan=9 style=| Non-conference Regular season

|-
!colspan=9 style=| SWC Regular season

|-
!colspan=9 style=| SWC tournament

|-
!colspan=9 style=| NCAA tournament

1988 NBA Draft

References 

Baylor Bears men's basketball seasons
Baylor
Baylor
1987 in sports in Texas
1988 in sports in Texas